

Y

Y